Lop, also known as Lopnor or Lopnur is a Turkic dialect spoken in the Lopnor region of Xinjiang, China. Its speakers are included as part of the "Uyghur" nationality in the census.

Classification
Lop belongs to the Karluk branch of Turkic languages, along with Uyghur and Uzbek. Its status as a distinct language from Uyghur is disputed. Although it has some features that differentiate it from standard Uyghur, it is considered by some linguists to be one of its dialects.

Phonology 

Lopnor Uyghur has the following consonants:

Lopnor Uyghur has the following vowels:

References

General

 

Agglutinative languages
Karluk languages
Languages of China